The 1979 Kentucky Derby was the 105th running of the Kentucky Derby. The race took place on May 5, 1979, on a track rated fast.

Full results

 Winning Breeder: Mrs. William Jason & Mrs. William M. Gilmore; (KY)

References

1979
Kentucky Derby
Derby
Kentucky
Kentucky Derby